Bomba is both a traditional dance and musical style of Puerto Rico. Its origins are rooted in the island's history of African slavery but today has evolved into a community expression of Puerto Rican culture. While Bomba can be used as the generic name for a number of rhythms, it is truly about a creative, interactive relationship between dancers, percussionists and singers. Today it's practiced as a communal activity in its centers of origin in Loíza, Santurce, Mayagüez and Ponce. Also, Puerto Rican migrants have brought the tradition to some parts of the U.S. mainland.

Puerto Rican Bomba is the first native music of Puerto Rico, created in the sugar plantations by slaves more than 400 years ago.  African slaves were brought to Puerto Rico by the Spaniards during the 1600s. The slaves came from different African tribes and through this music, they could communicate. It is Puerto Rican because it has elements of the Taínos (Arawaks) like the maraca and Cuás (2 wooden sticks previously played at the side of the Bomba Barrel), the Spanish like the footsteps in the dancing and the greatest influence of is the African native. This represents the Puerto Rican cultural mix. In Bomba, there are 4 instruments: a Cuá, a Maraca, the Buleador drum and the Subidor drum. In the Batey (sugar workers' town) or a Sobera'o (circle or dance area), the Subidor will score sounds for the steps that the dancer makes, and the Buleador or Follower, follows the rhythm that is constantly played until the “Cantador/a” (singer) says so. The dancer enters the Batey to stroll around, showing off, marking their territory and space. The dancer greets the Primo Barrel and begins its “Piquetes” (improvised Bomba steps). The dancer, with his/her “Piquetes” would be creating his/her own music and history, inspired by the song. Also, the dancer challenges the Primo Barrel Player (“Tocador/a”) by doing a rhythmic dialogue and making it difficult to follow him/her. Finally, when the dancer finishes providing the “Piquetes”, bows again to the Primo Barrel and the next dancer does exactly the same protocol. The “Piquetes” must have "elegance, firmness and shape." The "figures" are the “Piquetes” that must be executed with "elegance" and "firmness". During the dance, sometimes the audience shouts "Speak!". This is because the dancer is having a musical conversation or communication with the Bomba Drum (Primo) through his/her “Piquetes”. Traditionally, “Bailadores” (male dancers) perform their “Piquetes” with their body and the “Bailadoras” (female dancers) perform with the body and / or skirt with the petticoat. The Bomba traditional dress for men is white hat, white shirt and black or white pants. The women used to wear turbans, white shirt and skirt with petticoat. Petticoats were handmade to show them off in a flirtatious way for men and to create envy among other female dancers. How to hold and use skirt in the Bomba dancing is unique. This is because the dancer is having a musical conversation or communication with Dresser through their pickets.

In the beginning, the barrel was called Bomba and that is where the name of this old traditional music comes from. They created the barrel from the barrels the Spaniards brought the slaves to fill the rum made in the Puerto Rican plantations in times of slavery. The leather that is used is goat. The female goat leather is used for the Primo Barrels for its sound is sharper and the masculine is used for the Buleador Barrels so that the sound is more grave. The Primo Barrel is smaller and less wide so that it has a high-pitched sound and allows the Dancer's Pickets to stand out. On the other hand, the Buleador Barrel is made larger and wider so that the sound is grave.  Landowners allowed the slaves to play Bomba when they wanted and those few times, they led them because that was how they could "forget" that they were enslaved and heal their pain. With the Bomba, they healed their pains, did weddings and rebellion, fighting against the landowners and labor exploitation, they used it to their religions (Explanation Note: The Bomba is cultural and not religious, if they used it for their religions, that was their decision but this was not originally made for religion causes), in short, everything. There are also French, Dutch and English elements. The "Seises de Bomba" ("Bomba Sixes") (songs) is divided into verses and choruses alternated, and the verses are improvised according to the story or theme song. In these songs, there were the events of everyday life are recounted. The public must always repeat the chorus after each verse.

Important families of Bomba in Puerto Rico are the Cepeda of Santurce, Ayala of Loíza, the Alduén of Mayagüez, among others. Brothers Emmanuelli Náter (José, Jorge and Victor, students and friends of the Cepeda) with their Center for Cultural Research of Eternal Roots (Centro de Investigación Cultural Raíces Eternas) (CICRE in Spanish) created in Puerto Rico during the 90 so-called "Bombazos". They were devoted to “get down” the Bomba from the high stage, so that the Puerto Ricans and everybody else had more participation and learning in this folklore music. Thanks to this, today there are “Bombazos” in many parts of Puerto Rico and the United States. These are the modern and evolved version of the ancient dances of Bomba. Today it is emerging “Bombazo Generation” thanks to this.

There are 16 rhythms of Bomba, but 6 primary, and these derive others are Sicá ("walking"), Yubá (slow pace of feeling, sadness and courage and played mostly for the elderly, regional of Cataño and Santurce), Cuembé (flirtatious and sensual rhythm, mostly danced in pairs, regionally of Santurce and Cataño), Seis Corrido (formerly called Rulé, the rapid pace and only regional of Loíza), Corvé (only regional of Loíza) and “Holandés” (fast rhythm and regional of Mayaguez and Cataño). Sicá derivatives are Bambulaé, Danué, Calindá, Paule, Gracimá, Balancé, Cocobalé, Cunyá and Belén (this last rhythm was mostly played when the Bomba dance was performing his last song of the night). Yubá derivatives are Leró (rhythm mostly played in southern Puerto Rico) and Mariandá. The derivative of Cuembé is the Güembé (rhythm mostly played in southern Puerto Rico). So, there are others like the “Hoyo ‘e Mula”, “Alimá”, among others.

History

Bomba was developed in Puerto Rico some time after the trans-Atlantic African Slave trade in 1501. Although it is unclear when exactly  Bomba was developed in Puerto, the first documentation of Bomba dates back to 1797. During the 1800s there were several documented accounts of the use of Bomba as a rebellion tool against the slave owners, and organizational methods for initiating slave rebellions.  This particular style of music originated in Puerto Rico amongst the slaves who worked the sugar cane fields. These slaves came from different regions of Africa so they could not easily communicate with each other but they found common ground in music. With the migration of these slaves to different regions of the island bomba was practiced in different regions of the island each giving their personal twist to bomba music, for example in the region of Ponce they play with larger drums than other regions that are played by placing the drum completely horizontal. After a few years songwriter Rafael Cortijo introduced bomba to the Concert Halls by arranging it with brass instruments and more simple rhythm patterns, today bomba can be found anywhere on the island and in fusion with different styles like Jazz or Salsa music.

Up until the 1940s and 1950s, Bomba was heavily racialized and associated as premodern and Black. Bomba had been a marginalized music genre until musical artists like Rafael Cortijo and Ismael Rivera from the group Cortijo y su Combo, popularized bomba by taking it to various parts of the Americas and the world. On an international level bomba was fused with various national and regional musical genres creating a hybridization of bomba. On the Island of Puerto Rico however, bomba did not unfold in the same manner, it remained true to its folk tradition and geographically confined to parts of the island where there was a majority of Black Puerto Ricans in towns such as, Loiza, Ponce, Mayagüez, and Guayama.

Characteristics of the Bomba

Bomba is described to be a challenge/connection between the drummer and the dancer. The dancer produces a series of gestures to which the primo o subidor drummer provides a synchronized beat.  Thus, it is the drummer who attempts to follow the dancer, and not the more traditional form of the dancer following the drummer. The dancer must be in great physical shape, and the challenge usually continues until either the dancer or the drummer discontinues.

Bomba also is composed by three or more singers and a solo singer, the singing has a dynamic similar to those of "Son" where the lead singer sings a chorus and the other responds, and in between choruses the lead singer will improvise a verse. The theme of most bomba songs is everyday life and activity. In the case of a certain song called "Palo e Bandera", the lyrics discuss a love triangle between a female dancer, a female singer and the singer's husband, the primo player. The wife realizes her husband is cheating on her with the dancer and decides to teach her a lesson on the dance floor.

Instruments 

It consists of drums called barriles or bombas (made from barrels of rum, one named buleador and another primo or subidor), cuá (two sticks that were originally banged on the side of the barril) and a maraca. Dance is an integral part of the music: The drum called "Primo" replicates every single move of the dancer, this is called "Repique". Although the origins are a little scarce it's easy to spot the elegance and poise of the Spanish Flamenco and the energy and soul of African dances.

The traditional drums used in bomba are called barriles, since they have long been built from the wood of barrels. The high pitch drum is called "subidor" (riser) or "primo" (first), and the low pitch drums are called "buleador" and "segundo" (second). Not less important are the "Cuás" that are two wooden sticks banged on a wooden surface and a large Maraca that keeps time.

Rhythmic Styles 

There are several styles of bomba, and the popularity of these styles varies by region.
There are three basic rhythms and many others that are mainly variations of these three, they are: "sica", "yuba", and "holandés".

2/4 & 4/4:

sicá
belén Santurce
calindá
cunya
danué
gracimá
paulé
cuembé
alimá
balancé
belén Sur
cuembé Cataño
cuembé Santurce
güembé
güembé corrido
holandé 
francés
holandé Cataño
mariandá
mariangola
bámbula
bámbula
rulé
seis corrido
cocobalé
hoyomula

6/8 & 12/8:

yubá
corvé Loiza
yubá masón
yubá cuartiao
yubá Cataño
leró Sur
leró Santurce

Performers

Today there are many groups playing Bomba both as a traditional style and as a fusion with some other style. The most well-known traditional players are the Cepeda Family who have been playing Bomba for generations and the Ayala family, who are a family with a tradition of arts and crafts as well as Bomba music. Rafael Cortijo took Bomba to the mainstream with his Combo in the 1950s and 1960s. Puerto Rican composer Roberto Angleró wrote and sang "Si Dios fuera negro" ("If God Was Black"), a huge hit in Puerto Rico, Peru and Colombia during the early 1980s. Rubén Blades made a cover version of it once; the song was even translated to French and became a minor hit in Martinique. Some of the local musicians who also play this style are Yuba Iré, Paracumbé, Bomba Siglo XXI, among others.
 are bomba / plena musicians who travelled to Hawaii to perform for the Puerto Rican diaspora in Hawaii.
Willie Colón adds occasional bomba breaks to his songs, most particularly in sections of his biggest solo hit, "El gran varón". Ricky Martin also mixes a bit of authentic bomba rhythm with other Latino influences in his aptly named song La Bomba.

In California it has been popularized by Maestros de Bomba en la Bahía at La Peña Cultural Center.

In 1998, Son del Batey was founded in San Juan, Puerto Rico, by a group of college students at the University of Puerto Rico in Mayagüez. 1998 marked the 100-year anniversary of the United States invasion of Puerto Rico, and a time when popular discourse focused around national identity and colonialism throughout the island.

See also

List of Puerto Ricans
Music of Puerto Rico

References

Further reading 
 Aparicio, Frances R., "Listening to salsa: gender, Latin popular music, and Puerto Rican cultures", Wesleyan University Press, 1998. . Cf. p. 12 and book index.
 Barton, Halbert Everett. The drum-dance challenge: an anthropological study of gender, race and class marginalization of Bomba in Puerto Rico (Cornell University, 1995).
 Barton, Halbert. "A challenge for Puerto Rican music: How to build a soberao for Bomba." Centro Journal 16.1 (2004): 68–89. Online
 Cartagena, Juan. "When Bomba Becomes The National Music of the Puerto Rico Nation..." Centro Journal 16.1 (2004): 14–35. Online
 Dudley, Shannon. "Bomba goes to College--How is that Working Out?." Centro Journal 31.2 (2019) pp 198–222.
 Román, Reinaldo L. "Scandalous Race: Garveyism, the Bomba, and the Discourse of Blackness in 1920s Puerto Rico." Caribbean Studies (2003): 213–259.  Online

External links
 Puerto Rican Music. Magaly Rivera. 2020. Welcome to Puerto Rico: Music. See Bomba y Plena section. Accessed 19 June 2020.
 Bomba en Loiza, Puerto Rico. Rick Santiago. 31 March 2007. Accessed 19 June 2020. 
 Repica la Bomba entre los viejos hierros de la Central Mercedita.
  Centro de Estudios Puertorriqueños - Bomba events 
 Center for Puerto Rican Studies-Centro - Book Reading - When Julia Danced Bomba

20th-century music genres
Puerto Rican styles of music
Articles containing video clips
Puerto Rican music
Ponce, Puerto Rico